Josef Volf (born 11 January 1939) is a former Czech cyclist. Volf was born in Brno and his profession was an officer. His sporting career began with Dukla Brno. He competed in the team pursuit at the 1960 Summer Olympics.

References

External links
 

1939 births
Living people
Czech male cyclists
Olympic cyclists of Czechoslovakia
Cyclists at the 1960 Summer Olympics
Sportspeople from Brno